German submarine U-179 was a Type IXD2 U-boat of Nazi Germany's Kriegsmarine built for service during World War II.

Ordered on 28 May 1940, the U-boat was laid down on 15 January 1941 at the DeSchiMAG AG Weser yard in Bremen as yard number 1019, launched on 18 November, and commissioned on 7 March 1942, under the command of Korvettenkapitän Ernst Sobe.

Design
German Type IXD2 submarines were considerably larger than the original Type IXs. U-179 had a displacement of  when at the surface and  while submerged. She had two shafts and two  propellers.

U-179 was fitted with six  torpedo tubes (four fitted at the bow and two at the stern), 24 torpedoes, one  SK C/32 naval gun, 150 rounds, and a  SK C/30 with 2575 rounds as well as two  C/30 anti-aircraft guns with 8100 rounds. The boat had a complement of fifty-five.

First patrol and loss
U-179 sailed from Kiel on 8 September 1942 into the Atlantic, passing north of Scotland and then turned southwest through the gap between Iceland and the Faroe Islands. She headed south for the waters around Cape Town. She made her only kill on 8 October, sinking the unescorted . All but one of the 99 crewmen survived. The survivors managed to recover a cat from the wreckage after the sinking.

Sixty-one men died, there were no survivors.

Summary of raiding history

Gallery

References

Bibliography

External links

 

German Type IX submarines
U-boats commissioned in 1942
1941 ships
World War II submarines of Germany
Ships built in Bremen (state)
World War II shipwrecks in the Atlantic Ocean
U-boats sunk by depth charges
U-boats sunk in 1942
U-boats sunk by British warships
Maritime incidents in October 1942